Monegundis (also Monegund, Monegundes, died 570 AD) was a Frankish hermit and saint. A native of Chartres, she married and bore her husband daughters. When her daughters died in childhood, she decided to become an anchorite after a long bout with depression, and after receiving permission from her husband. 

She founded a hermitage, consisting of a private room, at Chartres. She later moved to a site near the tomb of Saint Martin at Tours. She thence acquired a reputation for holiness. This attracted other women to a similar lifestyle, and Monegundis devised a monastic rule that led to the founding of the convent of Saint Pierre-le-Puellier.

Her feast day in the General Roman Calendar on July 2.

References

External links
St. Monegundis
Saint Monegundis

6th-century Frankish women
570 deaths
6th-century Frankish saints
French hermits
Year of birth unknown
Christian female saints of the Middle Ages